Spilornis is a genus of bird of prey in the family Accipitridae. As adults all have dark crowns, and bright yellow eyes and cere. These medium-sized raptors are found in forests of southern Asia and are known as serpent-eagles; an English name shared with two African species from the genera Dryotriorchis and Eutriorchis.

Etymology
 spilos “spot”; ορνις ornis, ορνιθος ornithos “bird”.

Species
As traditionally defined, there are 6 species in this genus. It has been proposed that several small island populations, usually included in the Crested Serpent Eagle, be split into separate species.

References

 
Bird genera

Taxa named by George Robert Gray
Taxonomy articles created by Polbot